Samuel Richard Ryder (born December 15, 1989) is a professional golfer who plays on the PGA Tour. Ryder was born in Winter Park, Florida and attended Stetson University, where he studied finance.

Professional career
Ryder played on the PGA Tour Canada in 2014 and 2015. In 2015 he finished fourth in the PGA Tour Canada Order of Merit earning a place on the Web.com Tour for 2016.

In July 2017, Ryder had his first Web.com win, the Pinnacle Bank Championship, finishing 8 strokes ahead of the field. He finished second in the 2017 Web.com Tour regular season rankings to gain a place on the PGA Tour for 2018.

In 2019, Ryder qualified for the FedExCup Playoffs for the second time, finishing number 107 in the standings. Placed third in the Shriners Hospitals for Children Open and a tie for fourth in the Safeway Open.

In 2020, Ryder again qualified for the FedExCup Playoffs for a third time, this time finishing number 108 in the standings. Tied for third in the Puerto Rico Open.

In 2022, Ryder became the 10th Phoenix Open participant to make a hole-in-one on the 16th hole of TPC Scottsdale.

Professional wins (2)

Web.com Tour wins (1)

PGA Tour Canada wins (1)

Results in major championships
Results not in chronological order in 2020.

CUT = missed the halfway cut
NT = No tournament due to COVID-19 pandemic

Results in The Players Championship

CUT = missed the halfway cut
"T" = Tied
C = Canceled after the first round due to the COVID-19 pandemic

See also
2017 Web.com Tour Finals graduates

References

External links

American male golfers
PGA Tour golfers
Korn Ferry Tour graduates
Golfers from Florida
Stetson University alumni
People from Winter Park, Florida
People from Longwood, Florida
1989 births
Living people